The Green Goddess was a popular stage play of 1921 by William Archer. In the three years after its publication, the play toured in both America and England. It was included in Burns Mantle's The Best Plays of 1920-1921.

The 1921 Broadway production four-act melodrama was produced and staged by Winthrop Ames. It ran for 175 performances from  January 18, 1921, to June 1921 at the Booth Theatre.

Broadway cast

 George Arliss as Raja of Rukh	
 Ronald Colman as Temple Priest
 Ivan F. Simpson as Watkins		
 Cyril Keightley as Dr. Basil Traherne	
 David A. Leonard as High Priest	
 Helen Nowell as An Ayah	
 Herbert Ransome as Lt. Denis Cardew	
 Herbert Waring as	Major Antony Crespin	
 Olive Wyndham as Lucilla

Adaptations
The play was the basis for both a 1923 silent film and a 1930 talkie. Star George Arliss and Ivan F. Simpson reprised their roles in both films, as the Raja of Rukh and his chief aide, respectively.
In 1939, Orson Welles staged a version in New York, which was preceded by a short film prelude – this was two years before the release of his debut feature film, Citizen Kane. The footage is now believed lost. In 1943 a third film adaptation Adventure in Iraq was produced, with the setting shifted from India to the Middle East.

Things named after the play
Green Goddess salad dressing was invented in the 1920s, by the chef at the Palace Hotel in San Francisco, to commemorate the actor George Arliss and this play.

In 1925 a railway locomotive was named after it, the locomotive's owner having been inspired by the stage play.

Bibliography
 Jeffrey Richards. Visions of Yesterday. Routledge, 2014.

References

External links
Radio drama version by Orson Welles and his Campbell Playhouse (February 10, 1939)
1946 Theatre Guild on the Air radio adaptation at Internet Archive
  book by Louise Jordan Miln which was adapted based on Archer's play

1921 plays
Broadway plays
British plays adapted into films
Plays set in India
Himalayas in fiction
Indian mythology in popular culture
Hindu mythology in popular culture